Buddhist liturgy is a formalized service of veneration and worship performed within a Buddhist Sangha community in nearly every traditional denomination and sect in the Buddhist world. It is often done one or more times a day and can vary amongst the Theravada, Mahayana, and Vajrayana sects.

The liturgy mainly consists of chanting or reciting a sutra or passages from a sutra, a mantra (especially in Vajrayana), and several gathas. Depending on what practice the practitioner wishes to undertake, it can be done at a temple or at home. The liturgy is almost always performed in front of an object or objects of veneration and accompanied by offerings of light, incense, water and/or food.

Chinese Buddhist liturgy
The traditional Chinese Buddhist liturgy for morning chanting, evening chanting, and regularly scheduled Dharma services in the Chan and Pure Land schools combine mantras, recitation of the Buddha's name and physical and spiritual practices, such as bowing and walking meditation and vow making. Sitting meditation often occurs before or after the liturgy.  A typical order for chanting at these services is:

 Refuge in the Buddha (three times)
 Incense offering praise (on certain occasions)
 Sutra Opening Verse
 Sutra Reading
 Dharani recitation
 Food offering to hungry ghosts (evening only)
 Nianfo
 Refuge in the Triple Gem
 Offering to Weituo (morning) or Qielan (evening)
 Transfer of Merits 
 Meal offering dharani (morning and before noon only)
 Verses for concluding the meal
 Bowing in homage to ancestral patriarchs (on certain occasions)

Japanese Buddhist liturgy (gongyō)
In Japan, gongyo is also sometimes called o-tsutome (お勤め) or shōjin (精進). All three terms are common Japanese words and none is specific to any particular sect or school.

Origin of the word "gongyo"
The word gongyo originated in ancient China; although nowadays it is more often used in Buddhism, it first appeared in the Taoism classic Zhuang Zi. Its original meaning is "assiduous or hard and frequent walking/practice".

Chinese philosopher Zhuangzi abstracted and modified this word from an earlier classic of Taoism - Laozi's Tao Te Ching, in which it states:“上士闻道，勤而行之”, which means taking effort and practicing. During the Sui and Tang dynasties, the buddhist philosophy developed dramatically in central China, and was influenced by Taoism. Chinese Buddhist philosophers borrowed this word from Taoism classics, and it spread to Korea, Japan, Vietnam with Buddhism.

Pure Land Buddhism

The concept of gongyō is also common in Japanese Pure Land Buddhist schools such as Jodo Shu and Jodo Shinshu.  The central practice of these schools is the recitation of the name of Amida, also called the nembutsu, but in daily practice a Pure Land practitioner will also chant excerpts of the Larger Sutra of Immeasurable Life, particular the sections titled the Sanbutsuge or the Juseige, and in some temples chanting the entire Smaller Sutra of Immeasurable Life may occur once daily or alternatively only on more formal occasions.

In larger Pure Land temples, the daily service is performed by priests or ministers, and lay people can optionally attend and recite along if they wish.  The times for these services will vary depending on the individual branch, and individual temple.

In traditional Jodo Shinshu Buddhism, lay practitioners may also chant a hymn written by Shinran called the Shoshinge, which is not a sutra per se, but expounds the lineage with which Jodo Shinshu owes its beliefs.  A shorter hymn called the Junirai, the Twelve Praises of Amida, can be used as well.

In Jodo Shu, the nembutsu (Namu Amida Butsu) is often recited is specific format:
 Junen: The nembutsu is recited 8 times in one breath, without the final 'tsu' sound, then recited fully in one breath, and recited a final time without the 'tsu' sound again.  This is 10 recitations total
 Nembutsu Ichie: The nembutsu is repeated as many times as the practitioners choose to.
 Sanshorai: The nembutsu is recited 3 times in a long, drawn-out fashion, after which the practitioner bows.  This process is repeated twice more for a total of 9 recitations.

Shingon Buddhism
The gongyo of Shingon Buddhism differs amongst various sub-sects, but all of them mainly recite the Hannya Shingyo, the mantras of the Thirteen Buddhas and other mantras, the Light Mantra, and the gohogo; the saintly name of Kukai. In addition, recitation of other texts such as the Prajanaparamita-naya Sutra (Rishukyo), the Samantamukha chapter of the Lotus Sutra, longer mantras, and praises in mantra form are common in temples where priests reside. Gongyo is important for lay Shingon Buddhists to follow since the practice emphasizes meditation of the body, speech and mind of a buddha.

Nichiren Buddhism
Nichiren Buddhists perform a form of gongyo that consists of reciting certain passages of the Lotus Sutra and chanting daimoku. The format of gongyo varies by denomination and sect. Some, like Nichiren Shoshu and Nichiren Shu, have a prescribed formula which is longheld in their practice, while others such as  the Soka Gakkai International variedly change their gongyo formats depending on modernity, the most recent being the 2015 edition of their liturgy format.

Soka Gakkai International
In the Soka Gakkai International (SGI), gongyo is performed to "return to the very foundation of our lives" and "draw wisdom" from inherent Buddha nature, and achieves "the fusion or reality and wisdom"

Nichiren established no formal procedure for gongyo other than the recitation of the 2nd and 16th chapters of the Lotus Sutra, and at times even just the verse section of the 16th chapter. Hence the format had changed from time to time through the centuries. At the time the Soka Gakkai came into being, Nichiren Buddhist laity were not expected to do gongyo themselves; priests did it on their behalf. The first two presidents of the Soka Gakkai, Tsunesaburo Makiguchi and Josei Toda, taught members "not to hire priests to chant, as had long been customary, but to chant for themselves, a change they found both disarming and empowering"

The current format has evolved over the years. Originally, it followed the format of Nichiren Shoshu. In the 1970s, silent prayers were added for the success of the Soka Gakkai itself, and in memory of its first two deceased presidents, in addition to prayers for Nichiren and his disciple Nikko. Currently, after the recitation of the 2nd chapter and the verse section of the 16th chapter, daimoku is chanted for as long as desired, after which all the silent prayers are recited to conclude gongyo. The SGI's version of sutra recitation takes approximately 5 minutes, leaving more time for the primary practice of chanting Nam-myoho-renge-kyo. As of 2015, the silent prayers currently are: gratitude to the Gohonzon, to Nichiren, and to his immediate successor Nikko; appreciation for the three founding presidents of the organization; a prayer for the fulfillment of the great vow for worldwide kosen-rufu, for the human revolution and attainment of goals of the practitioner, and for the deceased; and finally for the happiness of all living beings. It is emphasized by the Soka Gakkai, however, that more important than the wording of the prayers is the practitioner's heartfelt intent in doing gongyo and expressing his or her appreciation and desires.

Nichiren Shu
Nichiren Shu has many types of gongyo a person can perform. One example of family service procedure is as follows:

Invocation (Invitation to the Buddha, Dharma and Samgha to be present at this service)
Kaikyo-ge (Opening Canon)
Lotus Sutra Ch. 2 Hoben-pon
Lotus Sutra Ch. 16 Juryo-hon (Jiga-ge)
Chanting Odaimoku Namu Myoho Renge Kyo
Lotus Sutra last part of Ch. 11 Hoto-ge (The difficulty in keeping this Sutra)
Prayer
Four Great Vows:
Sentient beings are innumerable; I vow to save them all.
Our evil desires are inexhaustible; I vow to quench them all.
The Buddha's teachings are immeasurable; I vow to study them all.
The way of the Buddha is unexcelled; I vow to attain the path sublime.

Chapter 2 (Hoben-pon) and Chapter 16 (Juryo-hon) are recited the most frequently; 
Chapter 12 Daibadatta-hon, 
Chapter 16 in its entirety
Chapter 21 Jinriki-hon (whole or from "Shobukkusesha") or 
Chapter 25 Kannon-gyo.

Recitation of the Lotus Sutra can be performed in Shindoku or one's own preferred language.

There is additional form of gongyo performed by Nichiren Shu practitioners at homes and in temples in which the entire Lotus Sutra is recited over the course of 32 days.

Nichiren Shoshu

The Buddhist service of “Gon-Gyo” (勤 行 , Persevering Action) is the basic supplemental service of Hokkeko believers. In the Head Temple of the sect, it is conducted first as the Ushitora Gongyo at the Dai Kyakuden (Grand Reception Hall), among other places throughout the Head Temple. In the past centuries, the service was performed in five different locations:

 Facing the Sunrise direction 
 Facing the Mieido
 Facing the Gohozo
 Facing the Kyakuden
 Facing the Mutsubo

The sect, along with the other Fuji sects in the area followed the custom of reciting the Sutra chapters according to what Nichiren himself once did: 

 Junyoze — Reciting the prose (散 文, “Sanbun”) of Chapter 2 
 Seoge — Reciting the verse (自 我 偈, “Jigage”) of Chapter 2
 Chogyo —  Reciting the prose (“Sanbun”) of Chapter 16 
 Nyorai Juryo — Reciting the verse (“Jigage”) of Chapter 16

During the 1930s, the Gongyo service was shortened to a single format, initiated by religious convert Tsunesaburo Makiguchi and was approved by 57th High Priest Nissho Shonin. Today, some Nichiren Sects in the Mount Fuji area recite the full four versions of the 2nd and 16th Chapter of the Lotus Sutra.

Current practice
At present, Gongyo is performed twice daily, upon rising and before retiring ("Often translated as morning and evening gongyo").
Its recitations of the Lotus Sutra are composed of the following: 
 The prose section of the second chapter
 The prose and verse section of the 16th chapter (2nd recitation only)
 The verse section of the 16th chapter. 
 Prolonged Hiki-Daimoku with five or three silent prayers.

In total, the following format is observed:
 Five sutra recitations are made each morning (silent prayers 1-5). 
 Three sutra recitations are made each evening (silent prayers 2,3,5).
 
These five morning and three “silent prayers” style (五 座 三 座, Goza-Sanza) for the purpose of the following:

 Protection from the Buddhist gods (Shoten Zenjin)
 Prayer to the Dai Gohonzon 
 Prayer for lineage or the priesthood
 Conversion of the Emperor of Japan and widespread propagation. 
 Prayers for the dead ancestors. 

Members of the sect may only use Juzu prayer beads with pure white cords and white Pom-Pom ornaments, having been consecrated by a Nichiren Shoshu priest at a local temple, while Nichiren Shoshu priests use an additional set of Juzu prayer beads with white string tassels. 

The brief rubbing of Juzu prayer beads is permitted in the beginning of ceremonies, but the habit of constant rubbing throughout ceremonies is deemed immodest and is prohibited during both Gongyo and Shodai (prolonged chanting).

See also
Metta Sutta
Mangala Sutta
Ratana Sutta
Awgatha, Burmese Buddhist Devotion
Buddhist chant
Puja (Buddhism)

References

Further reading
 
 Gombrich, Richard (1981). "A New Theravadin Liturgy," Journal of the Pali Text Society 9, 47-73
 Gregory, Peter N. (1993). Tsung-mi's Perfect Enlightenment Retreat: Ch'an Ritual During the T'ang Dynasty, Cahiers d'Extrême-Asie 7, 115-147
 Kariyawasam, A.G.S. (1995). Buddhist Ceremonies and Rituals of Sri Lanka, The Wheel Publication No. 402/404, Kandy: Buddhist Publication Society. 
 Picard, Francois (1999). Marcus Güzel, die Morgen- und Abendliturgie der Chinesischen Buddhisten, T'oung Pao, Second Series, 85 (1/3), 205-210 
 Tilakaratne, Asanga (2012). Theravada Buddhism: The View of the Elders, Honolulu: University of Hawaiʻi Press, pp. 155–158 (Appendix 1 A, Sample of Basic Theravada Liturgy: Vandana and Puja)

External links
 
 Gongyo Workout

Buddhist rituals
Buddhist devotion